Resolution(s) may refer to:

Common meanings 
 Resolution (debate), the statement which is debated in policy debate
 Resolution (law), a written motion adopted by a deliberative body
 New Year's resolution, a commitment that an individual makes at New Year's Day
 Dispute resolution, the settlement of a disagreement

Science, technology, and mathematics

Mathematics and logic 
 Resolution (algebra), an exact sequence in homological algebra
 Resolution (logic), a rule of inference used for automated theorem proving
 Standard resolution, the bar construction of resolutions in homological algebra
 Resolution of singularities in algebraic geometry

Measurements 
 Resolution (audio), a measure of digital audio quality
 Resolution (electron density), the quality of an X-ray crystallography or cryo-electron microscopy data set
 Angular resolution, the capability of an optical or other sensor to discern small objects
 Depositional resolution, the age difference of fossils contained in one stratum
 Display resolution, the number of distinct pixels in each dimension that can be displayed on a display device
 Graphic display resolutions, a list of particular display resolutions
 Distance resolution, the minimum distance that can be accurately measured
 Image resolution, a measure of the amount of detail in an image
 Optical resolution, the capability of an optical system to distinguish, find, or record details
 Printing resolution, the number of individual dots a printer can produce within a unit of distance (e.g., dots per inch)
 Sensor resolution, the smallest change a sensor can detect in the quantity that it is measuring
 Spectral resolution, the capability of an optical system to distinguish different frequencies
 Resolution of a spectrometer, the ability to distinguish two close-lying energies (or wavelengths, or frequencies, or masses)
 Resolution (chromatography), the separation of peaks in a chromatogram
 Resolution (mass spectrometry), the ability to distinguish peaks in a mass spectrum
 Spatial resolution, the pixel width on the ground
 Temporal resolution, the sampling frequency of a digital audio device
 In number storage, the resolution is the reciprocal of the unit in the last place

Other uses in science and technology 
 Resolution (beam engine), an early steam engine at Coalbrookdale
 Chiral resolution, a process in stereochemistry for the separation of racemic compounds into their enantiomers
 URL resolution, a process in interpreting URLs

Arts and entertainment

Film and television 
 "Resolutions" (Star Trek: Voyager), a 1996 second-season episode of Star Trek: Voyager
 Resolution (film), a 2012 horror movie
 "Resolution" (Doctor Who), a special episode of Doctor Who

Literature and poetry 
 Resolution (meter), the replacement of one longum with two brevia
 "Resolution", a poem by Bertolt Brecht
 Resolutions (short story), a 1911 short story by Franz Kafka
 Resolution (Parker novel), a 2008 novel by Robert B. Parker, a Western, sequel to Appaloosa
 Resolution (Wilson novel), a 2016 work of historical fiction by A. N. Wilson

Music 
 Resolution (music), the move of a note or chord from dissonance to consonance

Albums 
 Resolution (38 Special album), 1997
 Resolution (BoDeans album), 2004
 Resolution (Hamiet Bluiett album), 1977
 Resolution (Hidden in Plain View album), 2007
 Resolution (Lamb of God album), 2012
 Resolution (Andy Timmons album), 2006
 Resolution (Andy Pratt album), 1976
 Resolutions (album), a 2011 album by Dave Hause

EPs 
 Resolution (EP), Matt Corby EP, 2013

Songs 
 "Resolution" (Matt Corby song), 2013
 "Resolution" (Nick Lachey song), a 2006 song by Nick Lachey from What's Left of Me
 "Resolution", a John Coltrane (1926–1967) song from A Love Supreme
 "Resolution", a Mahavishnu Orchestra song from the album Birds of Fire
 "Resolution", by Romantic Mode, the second opening theme for the anime After War Gundam X
 "Resolution", by Haruka Tomatsu, the first opening theme for the anime Sword Art Online: Alicization War of Underworld
 "The Resolution", a 2008 Jack's Mannequin song from The Glass Passenger

Business and organizations 
 Corporate resolution, a legal document defining which individuals are authorized to act on behalf of a corporation
 Resolution (talent agency), a talent agency in Los Angeles, New York, and Nashville
 Resolution Copper, a copper mining project near Superior, Arizona
 Resolution Foundation, an independent British think tank established in 2005
 Resolution Limited, a Guernsey-based investor in insurance companies
 Resolution plc, a defunct manager of in-force UK life funds acquired by Pearl Group in 2008

Places 
 Resolution, United States Virgin Islands
 Resolution Island (Nunavut), in the Arctic region of Canada
 Resolution Island, New Zealand, the largest (uninhabited) island in Fiordland, in the southwest of New Zealand
 Resolution Island, a fictional island in the novel Brown on Resolution
 Fort Resolution, a hamlet in the South Slave Region of the Northwest Territories, Canada

Vessels 
 Resolution, a Douglas DC-6 aircraft, BCPA Flight 304, which crashed near San Francisco in 1953
 Resolution (1793 ship), an American trading vessel whose crew were massacred in 1794
 HMNZS Resolution (A14), Royal New Zealand Navy surveillance ship
 HMS Resolution, any of several British Royal Navy ships
 TIV Resolution, the world's first turbine installation vessel
 Resolution-class submarine, British Royal Navy
 Resolution (1802 ship), a brig built in Spain and launched in 1802

See also 
 Resolve (disambiguation)
 Resolved (disambiguation)